Weserstadion is a football stadium in Bremen, Germany. The Weserstadion is scenically situated on the north bank of the Weser River and is surrounded by lush green parks (the name 'Werder' is a regional German word for "river peninsula"). The city center is only about a kilometre away. It is the home stadium of German Bundesliga club Werder Bremen.

Artists that have performed at the stadium include Bon Jovi, Michael Jackson, Tina Turner, Depeche Mode, Metallica, The Rolling Stones, Guns N' Roses and Van Halen, among others.

With this the capacity rose with about 8,000 places. In 2004 four office towers were built behind the north stand. These towers offer a restaurant and offices for the club and local companies.

Starting in 2008 the stadium was completely rebuilt. The façade was coated with photovoltaic panels and a new roof was built on top of the old roof supporting structure (the old roof itself was torn down). Both ends (east and west) were torn down and rebuilt parallel to the endline of the pitch, removing what was left of the old athletics track.

International football matches

Gallery

References

External links

3D model of the Weserstadion
Stadium picture
 Official homepage

SV Werder Bremen
Football venues in Germany
Defunct athletics (track and field) venues in Germany
Buildings and structures in Bremen (city)
Sport in Bremen (city)
Multi-purpose stadiums in Germany
Tourist attractions in Bremen (state)
Sports venues in Bremen (state)
Sports venues completed in 1947